is a railway station in  Hamakita-ku, Hamamatsu,  Shizuoka Prefecture, Japan, operated by the private railway company, Enshū Railway.

Lines
Enshū-Komatsu Station is a station on the  Enshū Railway Line and is 10.2 kilometers from the starting point of the line at Shin-Hamamatsu Station.

Station layout
The station has a single island platform, connected to a two-story wooden station building by a level crossing. The station building has automated ticket machines, and automated turnstiles which accept the NicePass smart card, as well as ET Card, a magnetic card ticketing system. The station is attended.

Platforms

Adjacent stations

|-
!colspan=5|Enshū Railway

Station History
It was renamed to its present name in April 1923, Freight services were discontinued from 1973. The head offices of the Enshū Railway were temporarily relocated to this station during World War II. All freight operations were discontinued in 1973. The station building was reconstructed in 1979.

Passenger statistics
In fiscal 2017, the station was used by an average of 1,041 passengers daily (boarding passengers only).

Surrounding area
Yamaha Hamakita factory

See also
 List of railway stations in Japan

References

External links

 Enshū Railway official website

Railway stations in Japan opened in 1909
Railway stations in Shizuoka Prefecture
Railway stations in Hamamatsu
Stations of Enshū Railway